Lubor or Ľubor is a Slavic masculine given name, a derivative of Lubomir. It may refer to:

 Lubor Bárta, Czech composer
 Lubor Blažek, Czech basketball coach
 Lubor Knapp, Czech football player
 Ľubor Kresák, Slovak astronomer
 Lubor Niederle, Czech anthropologist and archaeologist
 Ľubor Štark, Slovak sprint canoer
 Lubor Těhník, Czech ceramist
 Lubor Tesař, Czech cyclist
 Lubor Tokoš, Czech actor
 Lubor J. Zink, Czech-Canadian writer

See also
 Lubomir

Czech masculine given names
Slovak masculine given names